Jaquette Liljencrantz (1848–1920) was a Danish (originally Swedish) writer, journalist, Women's rights activist and socialist.

She was employed by the Danish Social Democratic newspaper Social-Demokraten in 1875. She became the first female member of the Social Democrats (Denmark) in 1876.

References

Further reading 
  

1848 births
1920 deaths
19th-century Danish journalists
20th-century Danish journalists
Danish women's rights activists
Danish social democrats
19th-century Danish politicians
19th-century women politicians
19th-century women journalists